Du Jia (born 1 May 1993 in Tianjin) is a Chinese professional football player who currently plays for Chinese Super League side Shanghai Port.

Club career
In 2014, Du Jia started his professional footballer career with Tianjin Teda in the Chinese Super League. On 8 March 2015, he made his Super League debut in the season's first match which Tianjin Teda lost to Henan Jianye 3–1.

Career statistics 
Statistics accurate as of match played 31 December 2022

References

External links
 

1993 births
Living people
Chinese footballers
Footballers from Tianjin
Tianjin Jinmen Tiger F.C. players
Chinese Super League players
Association football goalkeepers
21st-century Chinese people